Noah Lindsey Cyrus (born January 8, 2000) is an American singer and actress. As a child actress she voiced the titular character in the English dub of the film Ponyo (2008), as well as having minor roles on shows like Hannah Montana and Doc. In 2016, she made her debut as a singer with the single "Make Me (Cry)" featuring Labrinth, which peaked at number 46 on the Billboard Hot 100. She has released three extended plays: Good Cry (2018), The End of Everything (2020), People Don't Change (2021). Her first full-length album The Hardest Part was released on September 16, 2022. She was nominated for Best New Artist at the 63rd Annual Grammy Awards.

Cyrus is the fifth child of Billy Ray and Tish Cyrus, and she is the youngest sibling of Trace, Brandi, and Miley Cyrus.

Early life
Cyrus was born January 8, 2000, in Nashville, Tennessee, to producer and director Tish Cyrus and country singer Billy Ray Cyrus. Her parents have had a volatile marriage, each filing for divorce on several occasions, but restoring their relationship. Her siblings include Miley, Braison, Brandi, Trace, and Christopher Cyrus, who have also mostly become musicians and entertainers. Their paternal grandfather, Ron Cyrus, was a politician in Kentucky.

Career

Acting
At the age of 2, Cyrus began her acting career, playing Gracie Hebert on the sixth episode of her father's TV show Doc. She was a background dancer in the 2009 film Hannah Montana: The Movie (with her real-life older sister), and played small roles in six episodes of the Disney Channel original series Hannah Montana. She appeared in the straight-to-DVD film Mostly Ghostly: Who Let the Ghosts Out? (2008), where she was spotted as a Trick or Treater. In 2009, her first film role was in the English version of the Japanese anime feature film Ponyo, in which she voiced the titular character. She sang the English version of the theme song to that film, performing alongside Frankie Jonas. Between 2009 and 2010, Cyrus ran a webshow with Emily Grace Reaves, called The Noie and Ems Show. In 2021, she guest-starred in the seventh episode of the horror anthology series American Horror Stories, playing a character named Connie.

Music

2016–2018: Music beginnings and Good Cry 

On November 15, 2016, it was announced that Cyrus had signed a record deal with Barry Weiss' record label named Records, and later signed a management deal with Maverick under Adam Leber. She released her debut single "Make Me (Cry)" featuring English singer Labrinth that same day. In December 2016, she released an acoustic performance of "Almost Famous". She also provided vocals on the song "Chasing Colors" performed by Marshmello and Ookay, which was released in February 2017. On April 14, 2017, she released another single, called "Stay Together", followed by the single "I'm Stuck", released on May 25, 2017. On September 21, 2017, she released another single "Again" featuring XXXTentacion. From September 19, 2017, to November 1, 2017, she opened for Katy Perry on the Witness: The Tour. In November 2017, Cyrus made an appearance at Emo Nite in Los Angeles for a surprise DJ set which included some of her and her brother Trace Cyrus' music. "My Way", a collaboration with electronic group One Bit, was released on November 24, 2017. Cyrus was named one of Time's 30 Most Influential Teens in 2017.

Her first single of 2018, "We Are..." featuring Danish artist MØ, was released on February 7. Cyrus released "Team", a collaboration with MAX, on May 11, 2018. A follow up collaboration "Lately", was released on June 15, 2018, with Tanner Alexander. On July 9, 2018, Cyrus announced her first headlining tour, The Good Cry Tour. "Live or Die", a collaboration with Lil Xan, was released on August 20, 2018. Norwegian DJ Matoma featured Cyrus on "Slow" in 2017, which was featured on his second album One in a Million, released on August 24, 2018. Cyrus released her new EP, Good Cry, on September 21, 2018, featuring new songs including "Mad at You" a collaboration with Gallant and "Punches" a collaboration with LP. DJ Alan Walker featured Cyrus' vocals on "All Falls Down" for his first album, Different World, which was released on December 14, 2018.

2019–2021: The End Of Everything and People Don't Change 

On July 31, 2019, Cyrus released a song called "July", as the first single of her second EP, The End of Everything. On July 24, 2020, Cyrus released a cover of Mac Miller's "Dunno."

On May 15, 2020, Cyrus released her second EP, The End of Everything, which AllMusic reviewer, Neil Z. Yeung described as "a vulnerable peek into the singer/songwriter's mental and emotional struggles through heartfelt and simple offerings."

After the good reception of The End of Everything, she was prepared to release her first full-length album in early 2021. Cyrus released "All Three" on December 11, 2020, with its music video the following week. She did not comment on the subject again until February 8, 2021, when she announced on her Instagram that she was about to release a joint EP with recently songwriting collaborator PJ Harding ("July", "I Got So High That I Saw Jesus", "The End Of Everything") and its first single "Dear August" was going to be out three days later. The EP was called People Don't Change and was released on April 23, 2021.

2022: The Hardest Part and tour 

On April 5, 2022, Noah announced her new single "I Burned LA Down", released on April 8. On that same day, she announced her debut album, The Hardest Part, for July 15. The album was preceded by three more singles: "Mr. Percocet" released on May 13, "Ready To Go" on June 23 and "Every Beginning Ends" with Benjamin Gibbard on August 26. However, in June 2022, Cyrus announced that the album was pushed back to September 16 due to manufacturing delay. Following the album's release, Noah released "I Just Want A Lover", from the album on the same day of its release. Later, on September 23, Noah launched "Noah (Stand Still)" with her father Billy Ray Cyrus version. On October 14, she released an acoustic version for the song "Unfinished".

After being announced in May and cancelling the European leg, Cyrus began The Hardest Part Tour on October 4. After 24 shows, the tour ended on November 4, just a month after it began.

On November 18, Cyrus and long-time producer PJ Harding released a new song, "Snow In LA".

Personal life
Cyrus dated rapper Lil Xan from June to September 2018. Cyrus is known to be vocal about her mental health challenges. She experiences depression and anxiety, with panic attacks as part of the latter. She has stated she goes to therapy to address these challenges. Her music often relates to her struggles, such as in her EP Good Cry with "Sadness" and "Topanga" and somber songs such as in her EP The End of Everything with "July" and "Lonely".

In December 2020, Cyrus spoke out in support of the former One Direction member Harry Styles wearing a dress on the cover of Vogue after he had been criticized by conservative commentator Candace Owens. However, in doing this she called Owens a "nappy ass heaux", prompting backlash against Cyrus for using a racist term referring Afro-centric hair texture. She subsequently issued an apology for using the term by stating, "I am mortified that I used a term without knowing the context and history, but I know now and I am horrified and truly sorry. I will never use it again. Thank you for educating me. I in no way meant to offend anyone. I am so so sorry."

Activism
In 2013, Cyrus used her 13th birthday as an opportunity to raise funds to ban the use of horse-drawn carriages in New York City. More recently, she has worked with PETA, first appearing in an ad protesting the use of animal dissection in high school science classes instead of plastic models or virtual dissection programs then in another supporting a SeaWorld boycott.

Philanthropy 
In 2019, after the release of her single "Lonely", Noah teamed up with the Crystal Campaign and released a merchandising collection called The Lonely Collection which funds were collected to The Jed Foundation, a non-profit organization in the United States that exists to protect emotional health and prevent suicide for American teens and young adults. Later, Cyrus joined the mobile app Depop and put on sale her own old clothes and its funds were also donated to The Jed Foundation.

Filmography

Discography

 The Hardest Part (2022)

Awards and nominations

Tours

Headlining
 The Good Cry Tour (2018)
The Not So Tour, Tour (2020)
The Hardest Part Tour (2022)

Opening act
 Katy Perry – Witness: The Tour (2017)

References

External links

 
 
  
 

2000 births
Living people
21st-century American actresses
21st-century American women singers
Actresses from Nashville, Tennessee
American child actresses
American child singers
American television actresses
American voice actresses
Columbia Records artists
Noah
RCA Records artists
Singers from Nashville, Tennessee
Syco Music artists
Walt Disney Records artists